The term Archdiocese of Belgrade may refer to:

 Archdiocese of Belgrade and Karlovci, central (patriarchal) archdiocese of the Serbian Orthodox Church.
 Roman Catholic Archdiocese of Belgrade, central archdiocese of Roman Catholic Church in Serbia.

See also
 Belgrade
 Archbishop of Belgrade (disambiguation)
 Archbishopric of Belgrade (disambiguation)
 Metropolitanate of Belgrade (disambiguation)
 Eastern Orthodoxy in Serbia
 Catholic Church in Serbia
 Diocese of Smederevo (disambiguation)